Atlantic squid can refer to:
 Loligo pealei, the common Atlantic squid
 Loligo forbesii, the eastern Atlantic squid

Animal common name disambiguation pages